Marshall Perlin (August 23, 1920 – December 31, 1998) was a civil-liberties lawyer, who along with Emanuel Hirsch Bloch, defended Julius and Ethel Rosenberg. He came to the trial after the sentencing, during the appeal process.

Background
Perlin was born on August 23, 1920 in Manhattan and later graduated from Rutgers University. He completed Columbia Law School in 1942, but his degree was not conferred until 1947 while he served in World War II.

Career

Perlin represented Michael Meeropol and Robert Meeropol, the children of Julius and Ethel Rosenberg after the Rosenbergs were sentenced. He was the trial lawyer for Morton Sobell, the Rosenbergs' co-defendant.

Personal life and death

He died on December 31, 1998.

See also

 Morton Sobell
 Frank Donner 
 Arthur Kinoy

References

External links
 An Interactive Rosenberg Espionage Ring Timeline and Archive

Rutgers University alumni
Columbia Law School alumni
Julius and Ethel Rosenberg
1920 births
1998 deaths